The Lone Bellow is an American musical group from Brooklyn, New York City.

History 
The Lone Bellow began as a songwriting project for Zach Williams, whose wife had suffered temporary paralysis following a horseback riding accident. During his wife's recovery, Williams coped with the experience by writing in a journal. At the urging of his friends, Williams learned how to play the guitar and turned his journal entries into songs. Following his wife's recovery, the couple moved to New York City.

Previously, Williams had been performing as a solo act around Brooklyn and New York City, occasionally being backed by a hired band. Williams recalls when The Lone Bellow's guitarist and old friend, Brian Elmquist met at Dizzy's Diner in Park Slope. Williams invited fellow singer Kanene Pipkin to join them at the diner, and it was then that the trio was initially conceived. Initially known as Zach Williams and the Bellow, the band shortened its name to The Lone Bellow before putting out any official releases. In 2012, the group signed with Descendant Records, a newly formed imprint of Sony Music, and released its self-titled debut, produced by Charlie Peacock, in January 2013. It was recorded at local NYC venue Rockwood Music Hall over the course of three days.

The album appeared at No. 64 on the Billboard 200. People named it No. 8 of the Top 10 Albums of 2013 and Entertainment Weekly said it was "One of the top reasons to love country music in 2013". The album was featured on 10 different Best of 2013 year-end lists.

The band announced in early 2014 that they would be recording a new album with producer Aaron Dessner of The National. The band released the first single from the album, "Then Came the Morning", which premiered on NPR's website on October 6, 2014. The band released a second single, titled "Fake Roses", which premiered on Stereogum on November 3, 2014. The album was released on January 27, 2015. Later in 2015, they toured the UK with Kacey Musgraves and were nominated for an Americana Music Award for Duo/Group of the Year on the strength of their album. In early 2016 the band members relocated to Nashville.

In 2017, Descendant Records partnered with Sony Masterworks to release the band's third album, Walk Into a Storm, recorded at the RCA Studio A in Nashville, produced by Dave Cobb and released on September 15, 2017. In 2020, the group released their second album with Dessner, Half Moon Light. Their fifth studio album, Love Songs for Losers, was released on November 4, 2022.

Members 

 Zach Williams – guitar, lead vocals
 Kanene Donehey Pipkin – mandolin, bass, keyboard, vocals
 Brian Elmquist – guitar, vocals

The trio are regularly accompanied on bass and keyboards by Pipkin's husband Jason, who has also contributed to the band's songwriting.

Discography

Albums

Singles

Awards and nominations

References 

Musical groups from Brooklyn